Lion Gardiner (1599–1663) was an English engineer and colonist who founded the first English settlement in New York, acquiring land on eastern Long Island. He had been working in the Netherlands and was hired to construct fortifications on the Connecticut River, for the Connecticut Colony. His legacy includes Gardiners Island, which is held by his descendants.

Early life
Lion Gardiner was born in England in 1599. He and his wife Mary left Woerden in the Netherlands and embarked for New England on the ship Batcheler on July 10, 1635. The ship arrived at Boston at the end of November in 1635. 

Governor John Winthrop noted Gardiner's arrival in his Journal under the date November 28: 
Here arrived a small Norsey bark of twenty-five tons sent by Lords Say, etc, with one Gardiner, an expert engineer or work base, and provisions of all sorts, to begin a fort at the mouth of the Connecticut. She came through many great tempests; yet, through the Lord's great providence, her passengers, twelve men, two women, and all goods, all safe.Dunn, 161

Career
Gardiner was a military engineer in service of the Prince of Orange in the Netherlands along with John Mason. He was hired by the Connecticut Company in 1635 to oversee construction of fortifications in Connecticut Colony. He finished and commanded the Saybrook Fort at the mouth of the Connecticut River during the Pequot War of 1636–37. In 1639, he purchased an island from the Montaukett tribe, which they called Manchonat, located between the North and South forks of eastern Long Island, in what is now Suffolk County, New York. The original grant by which he acquired proprietary rights in the island made it an entirely separate and independent plantation. It was not connected to either Connecticut Colony or New Amsterdam. He was empowered to draft laws for church and state.  He called it the Isle of Wight, but it is now known as Gardiners Island after him.

In 1660, Gardiner wrote the firsthand account Relation of the Pequot Warres.  The manuscript was lost among various state archives and rediscovered in 1809; it was first published in 1833.

Personal life

Shortly before departing from the Netherlands, he married Mary Willemsen Deurcant, the daughter of Dericke Willemsen Deurcant and Hachin Bastiens, who was born at Woerden about 1601. She died in 1665 in East Hampton, New York. They were the parents of three children: 

 David was born on April 29, 1636, at Saybrook. He married on June 4, 1657, Mary Leringman, a widow, at St. Margaret's Parish in the City of Westminster, England.

 Mary was born on August 30, 1638, at Saybrook, Connecticut.  She married in 1658, Jeremiah Conkling, the son of Ananias Conkling, who was from Nottinghamshire, England.

 Elizabeth was born on September 14, 1641, at Gardiners Island, New York. She married in 1657, Arthur Howell, a son of Edward Howell of Southampton, Long Island. Her death led to the witchcraft trial of Elizabeth Garlick.

Lion Gardiner was buried in East Hampton, New York. A tombstone with a recumbent effigy was erected in his memory in 1886.

Descendants
Lion Gardiner's descendants number in the thousands in the 21st century. Some of his notable descendants include:
David Gardiner, New York State Senator, father of Julia Gardiner Tyler
Julia Gardiner Tyler, second wife of President John Tyler; First Lady of the United States from June 26, 1844, to March 4, 1845
Mary Gardiner Horsford, poet and wife of chemist Eben Norton Horsford
Gardiner Greene Hubbard, lawyer, financier, and philanthropist. He was one of the founders of the Bell Telephone Company and first president of the National Geographic Society.
Aaron Bancroft, clergyman, married Lucretia Chandler 
Eliza Bancroft, married John Davis, lawyer, businessman and governor of Massachusetts
George Bancroft, historian and statesman
Chevalier Benjamin C. Bradlee, vice president-at-large of The Washington Post, executive editor of The Washington Post during the Watergate scandal.
Quinn Bradlee, author, founder and CEO of FriendsOfQuinn.com
Alfred Conkling, U.S. Representative, judge of the District Court for the Northern District of New York, U.S. Minister to Mexico
Roscoe Conkling, U.S. Senator, Republican political boss from New York
Alfred Conkling Coxe, Sr., judge of the District Court for the Northern District of New York and later the Court of Appeals for the Second Circuit, author
Alfred Conkling Coxe, Jr., judge of the District Court for the Southern District of New York
Louis O. Coxe, poet, playwright, and professor from Maine; best known for the Broadway version of Billy Budd
Bancroft Davis, married Frederika Gore King, daughter of U.S. Representative James Gore King
Horace Davis, a United States Representative from California
Henry Cabot Lodge, Jr., Republican United States Senator from Massachusetts; U.S. Ambassador to the United Nations, Ambassador to South Vietnam, Ambassador to West Germany; Special Envoy to the Holy See; 1960 Republican nominee for Vice President
George C. Lodge, the Jaime and Josefina Chua Tiampo Professor of Business Administration Emeritus at Harvard Business School
John Davis Lodge, actor, Republican politician; U.S. Representative; governor of Connecticut; ambassador to Spain, Argentina, and Switzerland
John Gardiner Calkins Brainard, lawyer, editor and poet.
Gilbert Hovey Grosvenor, first full-time editor and president of the National Geographic Society.
Gilbert Melville Grosvenor, is past president and chief executive of the National Geographic Society, as well as a former editor of National Geographic Magazine.
Melville Bell Grosvenor, was the president of the National Geographic Society and editor of National Geographic Magazine from 1957 to 1969.
Mabel Gardiner Hubbard married Alexander Graham Bell, an eminent scientist, inventor, engineer and innovator who is credited with inventing the first practical telephone.
Winthrop Gardiner, Jr., the 14th Proprietor of Gardiners Island.  He married Norwegian figure skater and actress, Sonja Henie, after his divorce from actress Mildred Shay.
 Gertrude Van Cortlandt Wells, married Schuyler Hamilton, Jr., the son of Schuyler Hamilton and great-grandson of Alexander Hamilton
Selah Brewster Strong, lawyer and politician from New York
Marcius D. Raymond, publisher, writer, genealogist, editor, historian
David Thomson, 3rd Baron Thomson of Fleet, Canadian billionaire and art collector
Kenneth Thomson, 2nd Baron Thomson of Fleet, Canadian billionaire, art collector, and philanthropist
Roy Thomson, 1st Baron Thomson of Fleet, Canadian businessman
David Gardiner Tyler, Democratic lawyer and politician, Virginia State Senator, U.S. Representative, son of president John Tyler
Lyon Gardiner Tyler, educator and historian, another son of president John Tyler
Robert David Lion Gardiner, Columbia College (1934), once an owner of Gardiners Island and "... the 16th Lord of the Manor ...".
Alexandra Creel Goelet, current owner of Gardiners Island. The Goelets offered to place a conservation easement on the island in exchange for a promise from the town of East Hampton not to up-zone the land, change its assessment, or attempt to acquire it by condemnation.  The Goelets and East Hampton agreed upon the easement through 2025.

References

Bibliography
Dunn, Richard The journal of John Winthrop, 1630–1649.Abridged Edition:  published by Harvard University Press
Gardiner, Curtiss C. Lion Gardiner, and his descendants with Illustrations 1599–1890. St. Louis, Missouri : A.Whipple, publisher

Further reading
Lion Gardiner, and his descendants with Illustrations 1599–1890. by Curtiss C. Gardiner, St. Louis, Missouri : A.Whipple, Publisher 1890
Gardiners Island Lighthouse
Encyclopedia of New York: Gardiners Island
The Worlds of Lion Gardiner Stony Brook University, March 20–21, 2009

External links
 Relation of the Pequot Warres (1660)
The journal of John Winthrop, 1630–1649 Abridged Edition: by Richard Dunn, published by Harvard University Press

1599 births
People from East Hampton (town), New York
People of the Province of New York
English emigrants
1663 deaths
Pequot War
Gardiner family